Duke of Santoña is a hereditary title in the Peerage of Spain accompanied by the dignity of Grandee, granted in 1875 by Alfonso XII to Juan Manuel de Manzanedo, an important railway and banking tycoon who contributed greatly to the Bourbon Restoration in Spain.

The title makes reference to the port city of Santoña in Cantabria.

Dukes of Santoña (1875)

 Juan Manuel de Manzanedo y González de la Teja, 1st Duke of Santoña (1803-1882)
 Juan Manuel Mitjans y Manzanedo, 2nd Duke of Santoña (1865-1929), eldest son of Josefa de Manzanedo e Intentas, eldest daughter of the 1st Duke
 Juan Manuel Mitjans y Murrieta, 3rd Duke of Santoña (1891-1965), eldest son of the 2nd Duke
 Juan Manuel Mitjans y López de Carrizosa, 4th Duke of Santoña (1917-1967), eldest son of the 3rd Duke
 Juan Manuel Mitjans y Domecq, 5th Duke of Santoña (b. 1951), eldest son of the 4th Duke

See also
List of dukes in the peerage of Spain
List of current Grandees of Spain

References

Bibliography
 

Dukedoms of Spain
Grandees of Spain
Lists of dukes
Lists of Spanish nobility